A longboat is a type of ship's boat.

Longboat or long boat or variant, may also refer to:

Places
 Longboat Key, Florida, an American town
 Longboat Corners, Ontario, in Canada

People
 Tom Longboat (1887–1949), Canadian athlete

Nautical
 Long boat rescue, rescue boats formed by long boats
 , a World War II Empire Ship
 Long-tail boat, Southeast Asian boat
 Celtic longboat, racing rowing boat

Other uses
 Longboat (horse) (1981–1997), UK thoroughbred racehorse
 Longboat Observer, American newspaper based in Longboat Key, Florida
 Tom Longboat Awards, awards established in 1951 to recognize aboriginal athletes of Canada

See also

 List of longest ships
 Longship (disambiguation)